Simon Kolkman (born 17 August 1977 in Hengelo) is a Dutch rower.

References 
 
 

1977 births
Living people
Dutch male rowers
Sportspeople from Hengelo
Olympic rowers of the Netherlands
Rowers at the 2000 Summer Olympics
World Rowing Championships medalists for the Netherlands
20th-century Dutch people
21st-century Dutch people